Niclas Lundgren (born October 15, 1989) is a Swedish ice hockey defenceman. He is currently an unrestricted free agent who most recently played with the Växjö Lakers of the Swedish Hockey League (SHL).

Lundgren made his Swedish Hockey League debut playing with Växjö Lakers during the 2012–13 SHL season.

References

External links

1989 births
Living people
Brynäs IF players
Linköping HC players
Malmö Redhawks players
Swedish ice hockey defencemen
Växjö Lakers players
VIK Västerås HK players
Sportspeople from Västerås